Charles Stedman (1753–1812) was a British Army officer who fought in the American War of Independence and afterwards wrote a detailed history on the conflict.

Biography
Charles Stedman, born at Philadelphia in 1753, was the second son of Alexander Stedman (1703–1794) and Elizabeth Chancellor.

Stedman was educated for the law at the College of William & Mary in Virginia. Like his father, he remained loyal to the British crown, and, on the start of the American War of Independence, he was appointed commissary to the troops under the command of Sir William Howe. His knowledge of the German language, presumably acquired from early intercourse with the numerous German settlers in Pennsylvania, stood him in good stead, both as interpreter with the Hessian auxiliaries, and afterwards as commander of a rifle corps of colonists from the Palatinate. He was twice taken prisoner, and sentenced to be hanged as a rebel; but on each occasion he managed to escape, once from the same prison that held the ill-fated Major John André. He was also twice severely wounded.

On the conclusion of peace in 1783, he retired to England on the half-pay of a colonel. He was one of those appointed to examine and settle the claims of the American loyalists. Through the influence of the Lord Cornwallis, Lord Rawdon's predecessor in the command, Stedman was in 1797, appointed to the office of deputy controller and accountant-general of the revenue of stamps, with reversion to the chief controllership, which, however, never fell in. He died on 26 June 1812, and was buried at Paddington.

Family
Stedman married Mary Bowen, by whom he had one son, John, who became judge of the court of admiralty at Gibraltar, and compiled a genealogical memoir of the family (1857).

Bibliography
In 1794 Stedman's History of the Origin, Progress, and Termination of the American War (2 vols. London, 4to, with folding maps and plans; and in the same year 2 vols., Dublin, 8vo) was published, which still remains the standard work on the subject. It is dedicated to Lord Rawdon, Earl of Moira, his former commander-in-chief. Shortly after it appeared Sir Henry Clinton printed Some Observations upon Mr. Stedman's History (4to, 1794), which impugn the author's accuracy on minor points; but these strictures appear to have been prompted mainly by personal feeling.

Notes

References
 Endnotes:
John Stedman's Memoir of the Family of Barton, continued through that of Stedman, privately printed, 1857

1753 births
1812 deaths
College of William & Mary alumni
British Army officers
British Army personnel of the American Revolutionary War